Hugh Adams Silver (14 July, 1825 St John's Wood - 27 March, 1912) was an English businessman, civil engineer and military officer.

Life 
He founded the India Rubber, Gutta Percha and Telegraph Works in Silvertown, East London in 1864. He became an associate of the Institution of Civil Engineers in 1861. He was responsible for giving ebonite its name. He founded and equipped the 9th (Silvertown) Essex Rifle Volunteer Corps and was its commander with the rank of colonel.

Family 
He was the son of Stephen Winckworth Silver, founder of S. W. Silver and Company.

References

1825 births
1912 deaths